Shi Xiaolin (born May 1969) is a Chinese politician currently serving as communist party secretary of Chengdu, capital of southwest China's Sichuan province. She is an alternate member of the 19th Central Committee of the Communist Party of China and a member of the 13th National Committee of the Chinese People's Political Consultative Conference.

Born and raised in Yuyao County, Zhejiang, Shi worked in government after university. She started her career in the Communist Youth League of China in Shanghai, where she eventually became a member of the standing committee of the CPC Shanghai Municipal Committee, the city's top authority. After a short term of two years in central China's Jiangxi province, in August 2021, she was transferred to southwest China's Sichuan province and appointed communist party secretary, the top political position in the city.

Early life and education
Shi was born in Yuyao County, Zhejiang, in May 1969. 

She graduated from Shanghai University with a major in electrical technology 1990 and received a Master of Business Administration from Tongji University in 2001.

Career in Shanghai
Shi entered the workforce in July 1990, and joined the Communist Party of China (CPC) in June 1993. She served in various posts in Zhabei District Committee of the Communist Youth League of China before serving as director and party branch secretary of Zhabei District Economic Committee in 2003. She became vice governor of Nanhui District in 2006 before being assigned to the similar position in Hongkou District in 2009. She was deputy communist party secretary of Hongkou District in 2011, but having held the position for only two years. In 2013, she was appointed director and party branch secretary of Shanghai Civil Affairs Bureau. She rose to become communist party secretary of Putuo District in April 2015. In May 2017, she was promoted to be a member of the standing committee of the CPC Shanghai Municipal Committee, the city's top authority, concurrently holding the post of head of the United Front Work Department of CPC Shanghai Municipal Committee.

Career in Jiangxi
In May 2018, she was transferred to central China's Jiangxi province, where she was a member of the standing committee of the CPC Jiangxi Provincial Committee and head of the Propaganda Department of CPC Jiangxi Provincial Committee.

Career in Sichuan
On 29 August 2021, she was transferred again to southwest China's Sichuan province and appointed communist party secretary of the capital city of Chengdu, the top political position in the city, and a member of the standing committee of the CPC Sichuan Provincial Committee, the province's top authority. She was China's youngest top official in the provincial capital and was at the time the youngest member of a CPC Provincial Standing Committee until the October 2021 appointment of Yang Fasen.

References

1969 births
Living people
People from Ningbo
Shanghai University alumni
Tongji University alumni
People's Republic of China politicians from Zhejiang
Chinese Communist Party politicians from Zhejiang
Alternate members of the 19th Central Committee of the Chinese Communist Party
Members of the 13th Chinese People's Political Consultative Conference